Dutch boy or Dutch Boy may refer to:

 The Little Dutch Boy, a boy who plugs a dike with his finger, featured in the novel Hans Brinker, or The Silver Skates by Mary Mapes Dodge
 Dutch Boy Paint, a US brand of paint, and its logo featuring a "Dutch boy" (i.e. a boy in traditional, old-fashioned Dutch clothing)
 "Dutch Boy", the weather satellite system in the film Geostorm, named after the boy in the Mary Mapes Dodge novel
 "Dutch Boy", one of multiple nicknames of the character Holland Wagenbach in the American police drama television series The Shield
 A man who has many lesbian friends; see

See also
 
 Dutch Boyd
 Dutch Bros.